Stig Strand (born 25 August 1956 in Tärnaby, Storuman, Västerbotten) is a Swedish former alpine skier and a sports commentator on alpine skiing. He is known for being sports commentator for SVT during many years after his career, and a few years on Eurosport, but ended TV commenting in 2016. He has also worked as a political advisor for the Swedish Social Democratic Party, and as a hotel owner.

Although successful, he was during his active years always in the shadow of his childhood neighbour Ingemar Stenmark. However, in the 1982–83 season, Strand also had 110 points like Stenmark in the slalom World Cup.

Individual World Cup victories

References

External links
 

1956 births
Swedish male alpine skiers
Alpine skiers at the 1976 Winter Olympics
Alpine skiers at the 1980 Winter Olympics
Alpine skiers at the 1984 Winter Olympics
Olympic alpine skiers of Sweden
FIS Alpine Ski World Cup champions
Swedish television personalities
People from Storuman Municipality
Living people
Tärna IK Fjällvinden skiers
People from Tärnaby
Sportspeople from Västerbotten County